Storm Cat (February 27, 1983 – April 24, 2013) was an American Thoroughbred stallion whose breeding fee during the peak of his stud career was $500,000, the highest in North America at the time. He was the leading sire in North America in 1999 and 2000, and the leading juvenile (two-year-old) sire a record seven times. He sired 108 graded stakes winners and eight champions, including Giant's Causeway, who also became a leading sire.

Although best known as a sire, Storm Cat was one of the best two-year-old racehorses of his generation, winning the Grade I Young America Stakes and finishing second in the Breeders' Cup Juvenile.

Background
Storm Cat was a dark bay horse with a white star and stripe on his forehead and white socks on his left feet. He was sired by Storm Bird, a son of Northern Dancer. His dam was Terlingua, an outstanding sprinter who was sired by Secretariat. William T. Young of Overbrook Farm purchased Terlingua in partnership with Bill Lockridge, who arranged the mating with Storm Bird. Lockridge then sold his share of Terlingua to Young, who thus became Storm Cat's breeder of record.

Storm Cat was foaled at Derry Meeting Farm in Pennsylvania. As a yearling in July 1984, Young intended to offer Storm Cat at the Keeneland Sales. However, Storm Cat tested positive for equine viral arteritis (EVA), and had to be withdrawn. "It was funny", said Young in a later interview. "Storm Cat might have tested positive for EVA, but he never had it. Anyway, Keeneland wanted me to bring him back in the September sale, but I just decided to keep him and race him." He was trained by Jonathan Sheppard, who was best known as a steeplechase trainer.

He was a high-spirited, well-built horse with a powerful hip, but suffered from offset knees. Peppermints were his favorite treat.

Storm Cat was the focus of the well-received 2002 nonfiction book "Stud: Adventures in Breeding" by author Kevin Conley.

Racing career
Storm Cat made his racing debut on August 11, 1985 at Saratoga racetrack, finishing second. He then won his next two starts, a maiden special weight race at Saratoga on August 21 and an allowance race at the Meadowlands on September 9. He then finished second in the World Appeal Stakes on September 28 before winning the Grade I Young America Stakes on October 10, both races held at the Meadowlands.

Storm Cat entered the 1985 Breeders' Cup Juvenile as the favorite and led by as much as three lengths down the stretch. In the last strides however, he was run down by Tasso and finished second by a nose. "If he had won that race," said Young, "he would have been a champion, and I think I would have been able to finally sell him."

Instead, Storm Cat underwent surgery over the winter for bone chips in his knees, then suffered a tendon injury. He returned to the racetrack in October 1986, winning an allowance race at the Meadowlands and finishing fourth in the Annapolis Stakes. He was kept in training at age four but was never fit enough to race. He retired with a record of four wins from eight starts.

Stud career
Storm Cat retired to stud at Overbrook Farm in Lexington, Kentucky in 1988 with modest expectations. His initial stud fee was $30,000, dropping to $20,000 in 1991. Even at this price, demand was low so Young would sometimes enter into foal-sharing agreements with the owners of quality mares – Young would pay the stud fee in exchange for part ownership of the resulting foal. In some cases, Young even gave seasons away for free to keep Storm Cat's stud career alive.

Storm Cat's first crop of 39 foals started racing in 1991 and were only moderately successful, with average earnings of just $16,850. Even so, two members of that crop eventually became Grade I winners.  When his second crop started racing in 1992, he started to establish a reputation as the sire of fast, precocious two-year-olds. He was the leading juvenile sire in North America in 1992, a title he would earn a record seven times (1992, 1993, 1995, 1998, 1999, 2002, and 2004). The previous record holder was Bold Ruler with six such titles.

In 1994, Young received the Eclipse Award for Outstanding Breeder, in no small part due to the success of Storm Cat's son Tabasco Cat, who won the Preakness Stakes and Belmont Stakes.

In 1995, Storm Cat's stud fee increased to $100,000, which was considered a bargain after yearlings from that crop sold for an average of $500,000. The crop foaled in 1996 included Aljabr, a multiple Group One winner in Europe on the turf, and Cat Thief, a Grade I winner in America on the dirt whose wins included the 1999 Breeders' Cup Classic. These wins propelled Storm Cat to the top of the North American sire list in 1999.

Storm Cat's next crop included 'iron horse' Giant's Causeway, who won five straight Group One races in Europe and then finished second in the 2000 Breeders' Cup Classic. Storm Cat repeated as the leading sire in North America, and also finished second in the standings for Great Britain and Ireland.

The crop foaled in 1998 was the first to average more than $1 million at auction and included Black Minnaloushe, who won the Irish 2,000 Guineas and St. James Palace Stakes. Storm Cat's stud fee increased to $200,000 in 1999, then to $300,000 in 2001. From 2002 to 2007, his fee was $500,000, the highest in North America at the time. His yearlings continued to be in high demand, reaching a peak in 2005 when 28 of his offspring were sold for an average price of $1,763,750. At the September 2004 Keeneland yearling sales, a Storm Cat colt since named Mr. Sekiguchi sold for $8 million, and in the 2005 sale, another of his colts, Jalil, sold for $9.7 million. The price was the highest ever paid for a yearling sold at the Keeneland September sale and is third-highest overall. All told, 462 of his yearlings were sold at auction for a total of about $319 million, including 91 yearlings that brought $1 million or more.

In 2008, Storm Cat remained in high demand with a fee of $300,000 but was retired from service because of declining fertility. Of 30 mares covered that year, only three were reported in foal.

In 2009, Storm Cat's services were offered to Quarter Horse breeders using artificial insemination, which is not allowed with Thoroughbreds. He sired one graded stakes winner this way, named Stray Cat. In 2015, it was announced that two clones of Storm Cat had been produced, though one subsequently died in a paddock accident. The clone is not considered a Thoroughbred by the rules established by The Jockey Club and the plan is to use him to breed polo ponies.

At the time of his death in April 2013, he had sired 35 grade/group one winners, eight champions, 108 winners of group or graded stakes races, and 180 stakes winners worldwide, who have earnings in excess of $128 million.

"For years Storm Cat has been very aware of who he is," said stallion manager Wes Lanter. "I've been fortunate to work around a couple of really great horses. I think the top ones kind of have that attitude in them that says, 'I am the best.' And I think part of that attitude is imparted on their progeny, and that, as much as good conformation, ability, tenacity and desire, is key to the success of a horse."

Champions sired by Storm Cat include:
 Silken Cat (1995 Canadian Champion 2yo filly)
 Aljabr (1998 Cartier Award Champion 2yo colt)
 Giant's Causeway (2000 Cartier Award Horse of the Year
 Hold That Tiger (2002 Cartier Award Champion 2yo colt)
 Storm Flag Flying (2002 American Champion 2yo filly)
 Denebola (2003 Champion 2yo filly in France)
 One Cool Cat (2003 Cartier Award Champion 2yo colt)
 Sweet Catomine (2004 American Champion 2yo filly)

Sire of sires and broodmares

 Storm Cat is also a noted sire of other successful stallions. By far his most successful son at stud was Giant's Causeway, who was a three-time leading sire in North America. Like Storm Cat, Giant's Causeway produced Grade/Group One winners on both turf and dirt, and left behind several promising sons at stud, including dual French classic winner Shamardal.

Storm Cat also left behind numerous other sons at stud, including Harlan, Hennessy, Forest Wildcat, Forestry, Stormy Atlantic, Tale of the Cat, and Bernstein. These sons have also produced further generations of good sires such as his grandson Harlan's Holiday and great-grandson Scat Daddy, the sire of 2018 Triple Crown winner Justify. Bluegrass Cat and Freud are successful regional sires in California and New York. Tiger Ridge became a successful sire when exported to South Africa.

His daughters have also made him a noteworthy broodmare sire. He was the leading broodmare sire in North America from 2012 to 2014 and has been in the top 10 every year between 2005 and 2015. Progeny produced by daughters of Storm Cat include:
 Speightstown, 2004 Breeders' Cup Sprint winner and Champion Sprinter
 Folklore, 2005 Breeders' Cup Juvenile Fillies winner and Champion 2-Year Old Filly
 Bodemeister
 Close Hatches, 2014 Champion Older Female Horse
 Shared Belief, 2013 Champion 2yo male horse
 Honor Code, 2015 Champion Older Male Horse
 Real Steel (JPN), winner of the 2016 Dubai Turf

Closest ancestor of two triple crown winners
Storm Cat is the great-grandsire of American Pharoah, winner of the 2015 U.S. Triple Crown and the great-great-grandsire of Justify, winner of the 2018 U.S. Triple Crown. No other horse appears within five generations of both champions' bloodlines.

Death
Young died in 2004 and the Overbrook stock was dispersed in 2009. However, Storm Cat remained at the farm until his death at the age of 30 on April 24, 2013. He was euthanized due to the infirmities of old age. He may also have been suffering from cancer at the time but it was felt the testing would have been too taxing for a horse of his age.

Pedigree

References
 
 Bloodhorse report on the 2006 Fasig-Tipton Florida auction

External links
 Breeders' Cup Juvenile

1983 racehorse births
2013 racehorse deaths
Racehorses bred in Pennsylvania
Racehorses trained in the United States
United States Champion Thoroughbred Sires
Thoroughbred family 8-c